Here's Hope! is an album by jazz pianist Elmo Hope which was originally released on the Celebrity label.

Reception

The Allmusic review by Scott Yanow stated "The one flaw of the album is that there are only 27 minutes of music, although the quality is quite high".

Track listing
All compositions by Elmo Hope
 "Hot Sauce" - 3:32 
 "When the Groove Is Low" - 4:59 
 "De-Dah" - 4:26 
 "Abdullah" - 3:45
 "Freddie" - 3:37 
 "Stars over Marakesh" - 6:44

Personnel 
Elmo Hope - piano
Paul Chambers - bass
Philly Joe Jones - drums

References 

1962 albums
Elmo Hope albums